Chattel may refer to:
 Chattel, an alternative name for tangible personal property
 A chattel house, a type of West Indian dwelling
 A chattel mortgage, a security interest over tangible personal property
 Chattel slavery, the most extreme form of slavery, in which the enslaved were treated as property
 The Chattel, a 1916 silent film